Cameraria temblorensis is a moth of the family Gracillariidae. It is known from California, United States.

The larvae feed on Quercus douglasii, Quercus dumosa, Quercus dumosa × engelmanii, Quercus engelmannii, Quercus turbinella and Quercus × alvordiana. They mine the leaves of their host plant. The mine is ovoid. The epidermis is opaque, yellow green. Mines normally cross the midrib and consume 30%-95% of the leaf surface. The mines are solitary and normally have two folds, although occasionally there are three. The folds are parallel or at slight angles.

Etymology
The specific name is derived from the type-locality (Temblor Range) and the Latin suffix -ensis (denoting place, locality).

References

temblorensis
Moths of North America
Fauna of California
Fauna of the California chaparral and woodlands
Natural history of the California Coast Ranges
Temblor Range

Moths described in 1981
Leaf miners
Taxa named by Paul A. Opler
Taxa named by Donald R. Davis (entomologist)